The St. James Encyclopedia of Popular Culture is a cross-curriculum English-language resource that publishes scholarly articles and features on a range of popular culture topics such as television, film, theater, radio, music, print media, sports, fashion, health and politics.

Publication history
It was first published by Gale in 2000. The encyclopaedia grew in size, and by its fourth edition (2003) it had expanded to 2,700 signed essays written by subject experts and professionals. It is  also available in print, and as an e-book.

See also
Low culture
High culture
Folk culture

References

2000 non-fiction books
American encyclopedias
English-language encyclopedias
Publications established in 2000